Gondolier is the third French language studio album by French singer Dalida. The album contains Dalida's second #1 hit, the famous exotical
Gondolier. The album contains other minor hits such as "Buenas noches mi amor", "Histoire d'un amour" and the pop-rock oriented "Le jour où la pluie viendra".

In 2002, Barclay Records, then as part of Universal Music France, released a digitally remastered version of the original vinyl in CD and in 10" (25 cm) vinyl record (LP), under the same name, as part of a compilation containing re-releases of all of Dalida's studio albums recorded under the Barclay label. The album was again re-released in 2005.

Track listing
Barclay – 80 088, 065 041-0:

See also 
 Dalida
 List of Dalida songs for a complete international listing of all Dalida's songs.
 Dalida albums discography for Dalida's long plays; 33 rpm/45 maxi
 Dalida extended plays discography for Dalida's extended plays; 45 maxi/45 rpm
 Dalida singles discography for Dalida's singles; 45 rpm

References

External links
 Dalida official web site

Dalida albums
1957 albums
French-language albums
Barclay (record label) albums